Zoanthus gigantus is a zoanthid first described from southern Japan.

References

Further reading
Reimer, James Davis, et al. "Molecular evidence suggesting interspecific hybridization in Zoanthus spp.(Anthozoa: Hexacorallia)." Zoological Science24.4 (2007): 346-359.
Reimer, James Davis. "Preliminary survey of zooxanthellate zoanthid diversity (Hexacorallia: Zoantharia) from southern Shikoku, Japan." Kuroshio Biosphere3 (2007): 1-16.
Aguilar, Catalina, and James Davis Reimer. "Molecular phylogenetic hypotheses of Zoanthus species (Anthozoa: Hexacorallia) using RNA secondary structure of the internal transcribed spacer 2 (ITS2)." Marine Biodiversity 40.3 (2010): 195-204.

External links

WORMS

Animals described in 2006
Zoanthus